The 2001 Tostitos Fiesta Bowl, played on January 1, was the thirtieth edition of the Fiesta Bowl and part of the BCS bowl schedule of the 2000 NCAA Division I-A football season. Held on New Year's Day at Sun Devil Stadium in Tempe, Arizona, the night game matched the fifth-ranked Oregon State Beavers of the Pac-10 Conference and the #10 Notre Dame Fighting Irish, an independent.

Oregon State quarterback Jonathan Smith threw for 305 yards and three touchdowns to lead the favored Beavers to a 41–9 rout. Wide receiver Chad Johnson had two touchdown receptions, and future Cincinnati Bengals teammate T. J. Houshmandzadeh caught the other. Ken Simonton added 85 yards rushing and a touchdown. The Beavers led 12–3 at halftime, then scored 29 points in an eight-minute stretch of the third quarter to put the game away, including a score on an unusual play where OSU's Terrell Roberts recovered teammate Houshmandzadeh's fumble on a punt return and himself ran 45 yards to complete the return touchdown. Notre Dame's sole touchdown came with under seven minutes remaining in the game, against OSU reserves, which completed the scoring.

Smith was named the offensive player of the game, and Beavers linebacker Darnell Robinson, who recorded two sacks, forced a fumble, and made an interception, was the defensive player of the game. The Beavers won despite being penalized 18 times for 174 yards, which set a school and Fiesta Bowl record.

Oregon State (11–1) was ranked fourth in the final AP poll, which remains the highest in the history of the OSU program. Notre Dame (9–3) fell to fifteenth after its fifth consecutive bowl loss, a streak which reached nine.

References

Fiesta Bowl
Fiesta Bowl
Notre Dame Fighting Irish football bowl games
Oregon State Beavers football bowl games
January 2001 sports events in the United States
2001 in sports in Arizona